is a Japanese actor and television personality associated with Amuse Inc. He is known for roles in Musical: The Prince of Tennis, Kyō Kara Ore Wa!!, and Shônen/Call Boy (2018), the television adaptation of Pornographer (2018)

Career 
Izuka debuted in 2006. He had his first lead role, Hikaru Todoroki in Tomica Hero: Rescue Force in 2008. He was a member of the theatre troupe, Gekidan Prestage (劇団プレステージ), managed by Amuse Inc. until 2019. In 2016, he was cast as Azuma Hirado in a theatrical adaptation of novel Shônen by Ira Ishida. Later, in 2018, he was awarded the same role in the movie adaptation with the same title. Consequently, he was cast as Haruhiko Kuzumi in a live-action series adaptation of Pornographer, first released on the FOD streaming platform by FujiTV, Japan. Pornographer  is a Boy's Love manga created by Maki Marukido. Due to the success of the TV drama Pornographer~Playback, Kyō Kara Ore Wa!! and Shônen, he has been receiving increased attention.

Izuka wanted to become an announcer at first, instead of an actor. However this signifies that he has talence in MC. In the end of year 2022 Izuka held the post of the MC, together with Taisuke Niihara for the event SUPER HANDSOME LIVE 2022, which is a throwback event to the fans, by Amuse, Inc.

Filmography

TV series

Films

Theatre

Audio dramas

Video-On-Demand dramas

Music Videos

Events

Commercial

Radio(Web)

Magazines 
Regular appearance(interviews) in magazines published by Shinko Music Entertainment from year 2016–present.

Books

References

External links 
 - Amuse, Inc.
Official Blog
 
  
 
 

1986 births
Japanese male actors
Japanese male film actors
Japanese male television actors
Japanese male musical theatre actors
Actors from Aichi Prefecture
Amuse Inc. talents
Living people